"Skull" is a song by Sebadoh from their 1994 album Bakesale. It was released as a CD single, and a 7" vinyl record.

A music video was made for the song. It reached number 96 on the UK Singles chart.

Track listing
US 7" Single (SP267)
"Skull (remix)"
"Punching Myself in the Face Repeatedly, Publicly"
 "Sing Something"
 "Plate 'o' Hatred"

UK CD Single (RUG22CD)
"Skull"
"Punching Myself in the Face Repeatedly, Publicly"
"Sing Something"
"Plate 'o' Hatred"

Sebadoh songs
1994 singles
Sub Pop singles
1994 songs
Songs written by Lou Barlow